This article lists the confirmed squads for the 2021 Women's EuroHockey Nations Championship tournament held in Amstelveen, Netherlands between 5 and 13 June 2021. The eight national teams were required to register a playing squad of eighteen players and two reserves.

Age, caps and club for each player are as of 5 June 2021, the first day of the tournament.

Pool A

Ireland
Head coach:  Sean Dancer

Ireland announced their final squad on 20 May 2021.

Netherlands
Head coach:  Alyson Annan

The Netherlands announced their final squad on 31 May 2021.

Scotland
Head coach:  Jennifer Wilson

Scotland announced their final squad on 21 May 2021.

Spain
Head coach:  Adrian Lock

Spain announced their final squad on 24 May 2021.

Pool B

Belgium
Head coach:  Raoul Ehren

Belgium announced their final squad on 25 May 2021.

England
Head coach:  Mark Hager

England announced their final squad on 28 May 2021. On 31 May, Shona McCallin was replaced by Catherine De Ledesma due to a foot injury.

Germany
Head coach:  Xavier Reckinger

Germany announced their final squad on 27 May 2021.

Italy
Head coach: Roberto Carta

Italy announced a 20-player squad on 28 May 2021. Their final squad was announced on 4 June 2021.

References

Squads
Women's EuroHockey Nations Championship squads